Jeanne-Philiberte Ledoux (1767 – 12 October 1840) was a French painter.
Ledoux was born in Paris and took lessons from Jean-Baptiste Greuze. Her work was first seen in public in 1793, when she showed three paintings in the Salon: Painting at Rest, Little Girls at a Crossroads, and Concealed Love. She is known for miniatures and portraits and exhibited in the Paris Salons from 1793 to 1819, in which she was a frequent exhibitor. Only one work attributed to Ledoux is signed, and none are dated.

Ledoux died in Belleville.
<>

References

Further reading
Harris, Ann Sutherland, and Linda Nochlin. Women Artists 1550–1950. Los Angeles County Museum of Art: Knopf, 1976.

External links

1767 births
1840 deaths
Painters from Paris
19th-century French painters
French women painters
19th-century French women artists